Tragosoma harrisii is a species of long-horned beetle in the family Cerambycidae.

References

Further reading

External links

 

Prioninae
Beetles described in 1851